Ariel Fernandez (born Ariel Fernández Stigliano, April 8, 1957) is an Argentinian–American physical chemist and pharmaceutical researcher.

Education and early career
Fernandez received Licentiate degrees in Chemistry (1979) and Mathematics (1980) from the Universidad Nacional del Sur, Argentina. He then earned a Ph.D. from Yale University in 1984 with a thesis entitled Structural Stability of Chemical Systems at Critical Regimes

Career
Fernandez held the Karl F. Hasselmann Professorship of Bioengineering at Rice University until 2011. He is a member of the National Scientific and Technical Research Council (CONICET) in Argentina. 

Fernandez developed the concept of the dehydron, an adhesive structural defect in a soluble protein that promotes its own dehydration. The nonconserved nature of protein dehydrons has implications for drug discovery, as dehydrons may be targeted by highly specific drugs/ligands. This technology was applied by Fernandez and collaborators to design a new compound based on the anticancer drug Gleevec, in order to reduce its cardiotoxicity. In laboratory tests, the new compound was similar to Gleevec in inhibiting gastrointestinal stromal tumors, but without toxic effects on cardiac cells, although it lacked Gleevec's inhibitory effects on leukemia cells.

The editorial board of the Proceedings of the National Academy of Sciences retracted a January 2006 paper coauthored by Fernandez because it had "substantial overlap", without attribution, of figures and text from an article by Fernandez published in Structure the previous month, a form of duplicate publication. The website Retraction Watch has documented incidences of scientific concerns about some of Fernandez's other publications, claims that Fernandez has denied.

Awards
Fernandez was awarded a Camille Dreyfus Teacher-Scholar Award for early-career researchers in 1991; a Guggenheim Fellowship for researchers in Latin America and the Caribbean in 1995; and was elected a Fellow of the American Institute for Medical and Biological Engineering for his "contributions to understanding protein folding and protein-protein interactions and the use of this knowledge to design new drugs", in 2006.

Books
 Transformative Concepts for Drug Design: Target Wrapping, by Ariel Fernández (Springer-Verlag, Berlin, Heidelberg, 2010).
 Biomolecular Interfaces, by Ariel Fernández Stigliano (Springer-Verlag, Berlin, Heidelberg, 2015).
 Physics at the Biomolecular Interface, by Ariel Fernández (Springer International Publishing AG, Switzerland, 2016).
 A Mathematical Approach to Protein Biophysics, by L. Ridgeway Scott and Ariel Fernández (Springer, 2017).
 Artificial Intelligence Platform for Molecular Targeted Therapy: A Translational Science Approach, by Ariel Fernández (World Scientific Publishing Co., 2021).

References

1957 births
Argentine biophysicists
Argentine emigrants to the United States
Living people
People from Bahía Blanca
Physical chemists
Rice University faculty
Theoretical chemists
Yale Graduate School of Arts and Sciences alumni
Universidad Nacional del Sur alumni
University of Miami faculty
Fellows of the American Institute for Medical and Biological Engineering